Frogger II: ThreeeDeep! is a video game released in 1984 by Parker Brothers for the Apple II, Atari 8-bit family, Atari 2600, Atari 5200, ColecoVision, Commodore 64 and IBM PC. It is a sequel to the 1981 Konami Frogger arcade video game and has similar gameplay.

The goal of Frogger II is to maneuver each frog to a berth at the top of the screen.  Once all of the berths are filled the player progresses to the next level. Unlike its predecessor, the game features three consecutive screens for each level rather than one screen per level, with berths at the top of each of the three screens that need to be filled.

Reception
In a 1984 review of the Commodore 64 cartridge for Electronic Games, Louise Kohl wrote, "Fans of the original will be very pleased with its successor, and newer fans will find it appealing and challenging as well. A year ago, before the rise of computer action games with their greater emphasis on strategy, this would have been a more exciting release."

Also writing for Electronic Games, Ted Salamone was impressed that the Atari 2600 version "actually looks, plays, and sounds state of the art, all on the lowly 2600." He pointed out some flickering and difficult to distinguish objects, but still called the overall package "flawless." Computer Games gave the Atari 8-bit family version an A rating, saying it "makes the original look like kid stuff." Computer and Video Games rated the ColecoVision version 48% in 1989.

See also
Pacific Coast Highway, 1982 Frogger-inspired game with two screens

Notes

References

External links
Frogger II: ThreeeDeep! for the Atari 8-bit family at Atari Mania
 Frogger II: ThreeeDeep! for the Atari 2600 at Atari Mania

1984 video games
Action video games
Apple II games
Atari 2600 games
Atari 5200 games
Atari 8-bit family games
ColecoVision games
Commodore 64 games
Frogger
Multiplayer and single-player video games
Parker Brothers video games
Sega games
Video game sequels
Video games developed in the United States
Video games with underwater settings